Roland Dunstan Moyle PC (12 March 1928 – 14 July 2017) was a British Labour politician.

Early life

Moyle was born in March 1928. His father was Arthur Moyle who was a Labour Member of Parliament and served as Parliamentary Private Secretary to Clement Attlee. Moyle was educated in Bexleyheath and Llanidloes, and at the University College of Wales, Aberystwyth and Trinity Hall, Cambridge, where he chaired the Labour Club in 1953.

He became a barrister, called to the bar by Gray's Inn in 1954. He was an industrial relations consultant and worked as secretary of the National Joint Industrial Council to the Gas Industry, and National Joint Council in Gas Staffs from 1956 and the sister body in the electrical industry from 1965. He served as a councillor in the London Borough of Greenwich from 1964 and was president of Greenwich Labour Party.

Member of Parliament

Moyle was elected Member of Parliament for Lewisham North in 1966, and after boundary changes, for Lewisham East in 1974. After a spell as Parliamentary Secretary to the Ministry of Agriculture, Fisheries and Food, he was Minister of State for Northern Ireland from 1974 to 1976, and Minister of Health from 1976 to 1979. Privy counsellor 1978. In Labour's landslide general election defeat of 1983, Moyle lost his seat to the Conservative Colin Moynihan.

Later life and death

Moyle later became deputy chairman of the police complaints authority 1985 to 1991.

He died on 14 July 2017 at the age of 89.

References

Times Guide to the House of Commons, 1966 and 1983 
 

1928 births
2017 deaths
Alumni of Aberystwyth University
Alumni of Trinity Hall, Cambridge
Labour Party (UK) MPs for English constituencies
Members of the Privy Council of the United Kingdom
Northern Ireland Office junior ministers
Sons of life peers
UK MPs 1966–1970
UK MPs 1970–1974
UK MPs 1974
UK MPs 1974–1979
UK MPs 1979–1983